Litecoin (Abbreviation: LTC; sign: Ł) is a decentralized peer-to-peer cryptocurrency and open-source software project released under the MIT/X11 license. Inspired by Bitcoin, Litecoin was among the earliest altcoins, starting in October 2011.  In technical details, the Litecoin main chain shares a slightly modified Bitcoin codebase. The practical effects of those codebase differences are lower transaction fees, faster transaction confirmations, and faster mining difficulty retargeting. Due to its underlying similarities to Bitcoin, Litecoin has historically been referred to as the "silver to Bitcoin's gold." In 2022, Litecoin added optional privacy features via soft fork through the MWEB (MimbleWimble extension block) upgrade.

Design

Units and divisibility
Currency codes for representing litecoin is LTC. Its Unicode character is Ł.

One litecoin is divisible to eight decimal places.

History

Pre-Litecoin 
By 2011, Bitcoin mining was largely performed by GPUs. This raised concern in some users that mining now had a high barrier to entry, and that CPU resources were becoming obsolete and worthless for mining. Using code from Bitcoin, a new alternative currency was created called Tenebrix (TBX). Tenebrix replaced the SHA-256 rounds in Bitcoin's mining algorithm with the scrypt function, which had been specifically designed in 2009 to be expensive to accelerate with FPGA or ASIC chips. This would allow Tenebrix to have been "GPU-resistant", and utilize the available CPU resources from bitcoin miners. Tenebrix itself was a successor project to an earlier cryptocurrency which replaced Bitcoin's issuance schedule with a constant block reward (thus creating an unlimited money supply). However, the developers included a clause in the code that would allow them to claim 7.7 million TBX for themselves at no cost, which was criticized by users. 

To address this, Charlie Lee, a Google employee who would later become engineering director at Coinbase, created an alternative version of Tenebrix called Fairbrix (FBX). Litecoin inherits the scrypt mining algorithm from Fairbrix, but returns to the limited money supply of Bitcoin, with other changes.

Creation and launch 
Lee released Litecoin via an open-source client on GitHub on October 7, 2011. The Litecoin network went live on October 13, 2011.

Litecoin was a source code fork of the Bitcoin Core client, originally differing by having a decreased block generation time (2.5 minutes), increased maximum number of coins, different hashing algorithm (scrypt, instead of SHA-256), faster difficulty retarget, and a slightly modified GUI.

2011–2016 
After launch, the early growth of Litecoin was aided by its increasing exchange availability and liquidity on early exchanges such as BTC-e.   During the month of November 2013, the aggregate value of Litecoin experienced massive growth which included a 100% leap within 24 hours. 

In early 2014, Lee suggested merge mining (auxPOW) Dogecoin with Litecoin to the Dogecoin community at large. In September 2014, Dogecoin began merge-mining with Litecoin, providing increased security for Dogecoin and a permanent block subsidy that previously was not available with Litecoin mining.

2017–2021 

In 2020, PayPal added the ability for users to purchase a derivative of Litecoin along with Bitcoin, Ethereum and Bitcoin Cash which could not be withdrawn or spent as part of its Crypto feature.

In September 2021, a fake press release was published on GlobeNewswire announcing a partnership between Litecoin and Walmart. This caused the price of Litecoin to increase by around 30%, before the press release was revealed as a hoax.

2022–present 
In May 2022, MWEB (Mimblewimble Extension Blocks) upgrade was activated on the Litecoin network as a soft fork. This upgrade provides users with the option of sending confidential Litecoin transactions, in which the amount being sent is only known between the sender and receiver.

In June 2022, PayPal added the ability for users to transfer Litecoin along with Bitcoin, Ethereum and Bitcoin Cash between PayPal to other wallets and exchanges.

Differences from Bitcoin 
Litecoin is different in some ways from Bitcoin:

 The targeted block time is every 2.5 minutes for Litecoin, as opposed to Bitcoin's 10 minutes. This allows Litecoin to confirm transactions four times faster than Bitcoin.
 Scrypt, an alternative proof-of-work algorithm, is used for Litecoin. It differs from Bitcoin's SHA-256 algorithm in part by including a sequential memory-hard function, requiring asymptotically more memory than an algorithm which is not memory-hard. Due to Litecoin's use of the scrypt algorithm, FPGA and ASIC devices made for mining Litecoin are more complicated to create and more expensive to produce than they are for Bitcoin, which uses SHA-256.
 Litecoin is merge mined with another prominent cryptocurrency (Dogecoin), increasing miner compensation and network security for both blockchains.
 Litecoin has a maximum circulating supply of Ł84,000,000, which is four times larger than Bitcoin's maximum circulating supply of ₿21,000,000.
 Both Litecoin and Bitcoin retarget their mining difficulty every 2016 blocks. However, due to the 4x faster block speed for Litecoin, mining difficulty retargets occur approximately every 3.5 days. This compares to approximately every 14 days for Bitcoin.
 MWEB optional privacy was added to Litecoin's base layer in May 2022 via soft fork. This allows amounts held within wallets and transaction amounts within MWEB to be private.

Third party vendors providing point of sale infrastructure for Litecoin include companies such as Verifone, BitPay, and Coingate. BitPay added support for Litecoin in 2021, with Litecoin initially accounting for less than 3% of BitPay transactions. As of June 2022, Litecoin had grown to represent 21% of BitPay transactions by payment count.

See also 
 List of scrypt crypto currencies

Notes

References

External links 

 

2011 software
Cryptocurrency projects
Currencies introduced in 2011
Computer-related introductions in 2011